The Pontifical Academy of Martyrs (Pontificia Academia Cultorum Martyrum, originally Collegium Cultorum Martyrum) is one of the ten Pontifical Academies established by the Holy See. It serves to advance the cult of saints and martyrs and the study of related early Christian history, including the catacombs. It operates with guidance and support from the Congregation for Divine Worship and the Discipline of the Sacraments and the Roman Curia.

History

The Academy was established on 2 February 1879 by four distinguished scholars of sacred antiquity: Mariano Armellini, Adolfo Hytreck, Orazio Marucchi, and Enrico Stevenson.

With Pope Francis' reorganization of the Roman Curia as of 5 June 2022 as provided for in the apostolic constitution Praedicate evangelium, the new Dicastery for Culture and Education became responsible for coordinating the work of this Academy with its own work and that of a number of other bodies.

Functions
The Academy is tasked with promoting the cult of the holy martyrs and increasing, through study, knowledge of the saints, including their example as "witnesses of the Faith". 

It is also responsible for the monuments to these saints from the first centuries of Christianity, including the catacombs beneath Rome. The Academy organises and promotes celebrations of ancient Christian cemeteries, the catacombs, and other sacred places, as well as religious functions and archaeological conferences. To this end it works closely with the Pontifical Academy of Archaeology.

The Academy holds at least two general meetings each year, close to the Papal Institute of Christian Archaeology and the Collegio Teutonico in Vatican City.

During Lent, the Academy also supports the celebration of the station days, which combine fasting with processions to certain Roman churches, a practice revived by Carlo Respighi, who was magister from 1931 to 1947.

Membership and leadership 
The Academy's membership consists of "Sodales" and "Associates" of both sexes. At the age of 80 a sodales becomes a soldales emeritus. A cardinal or bishop sodales is appointed "Defences".

The title of the Academy's administrator is "magister", an office appointed and renewed by the pope. The magister, in accordance with the Academy's "Guiding Advice", can collaborate with other pontifical academies which have business related to a particular martyr's sanctuary. 

Since 16 September 2022, the magister has been Dr. Raffaella Giuliani. She previously held the title "arcarius" (treasurer).

See also
 Index of Vatican City-related articles
 Roman Academies

References

Attribution

External links 
 

 
Religious organizations established in 1879
Dicastery for Culture and Education